Nebria angusticollis is a species of ground beetle in Nebriinae subfamily that can be found in the Alps of France, Italy, and Switzerland.

Subspecies
The species bears 2 subspecies all of which could be found in the Alps of  France, Italy, and Switzerland:
Nebria angusticollis angusticollis Bonelli, 1810
Nebria angusticollis microcephala K. Daniel & D. Daniel, 1891

References

angusticollis
Beetles described in 1810
Beetles of Europe